Star Vehicle (re-titled in North America as Bleading Lady) is a 2010 horror film directed by Ryan Nicholson and starring Dan Ellis, Sindy Faraguna, Nathan Durec and Nick Windebank.

Premise

The film tells the tale of frustrated Teamster driver Don Cardini, abused by spoiled stars and arrogant students, who becomes a ticking time-bomb of revenge. As Don goes on the rampage, his favourite scream queen, Riversa Red, finds herself up for a new role in the greatest gorefest of all: real life.

Cast

 Dan Ellis as Don/The Driver
 Sindy Faraguna as Riversa Red
 Nathan Durec as Luke
 Erendira Farga as Sienna
 Kris Michaleski as Jordan
 Mike Li as Frank
 Paige Farbacher as Jenny
 Ady Mejia as Deb
 Gary Starkell as The Squatter
 Joshua Garcia as The Grip
 Jason Hermandez as The Gaffer
 Evanghelia Katsiris as The First A.D.
 Dave Thompson as The D.O.P.
 Matt Janega as the Brother/Stalker
 Ronny Monahan as Thomas
 Rachelle George as Chris
 Jarod Joseph as Jodi
 Babak Salimy as Rick
 Rochelle Jones as The Producer
 Paul Baynton as The Masked Psycho
 Francisco Cano as The Mullet Dude
 Guy Russell as Guy The Owner
 Tina Baloochestany as Danielle
 Randy Jones as Randy

Production
Ryan Nicholson produced Star Vehicle / Bleading Lady via Plotdigger Films company. Michelle Grady and Nicholson produce the flick for New Image Entertainment.

Soundtrack
Zombi's Steve Moore scored the soundtrack for the film under the pseudonym Gianni Rossi. This is the second Moore soundtrack for a Nicholson film, the first being Gutterballs.

Release
Star Vehicle was released in censored form in Europe in the fall of 2010. An uncut North American release under the title Bleading Lady is scheduled for March 2011.

References

External links

Star Vehicle / Bleading Lady at Plotdigger Films

2010 horror films
2010 films
English-language Canadian films
2010s slasher films
Films directed by Ryan Nicholson
Canadian splatter films
Canadian slasher films
Squatting in film
2010s English-language films
2010s Canadian films